Charles Alexander Landsborough (born 26 October 1941) is a British country and folk musician and singer-songwriter.  He started singing professionally in the 1970s, although his major success did not come until 1994 with his song "What Colour is the Wind".  He is one of the UK's top country acts and is also popular in Ireland, Australia and New Zealand.

Life
Born in Wrexham, Denbighshire, Wales, Landsborough was the youngest of 11 children. Soon after he was born, his mother (Aggie) moved the family back to Birkenhead after the World War II bombing raids.  He was reared by the docklands of Birkenhead near the dumps, railway lines, coal wharf and oil factories.

He left school early and worked intermittently as an apprentice telephone engineer, on the railways, and in the flour mills before joining the army. He left after four years, in the early 1960s, and joined a group, The Chicago Sect, in Dortmund, Germany. Returning to England, he married, played in local bands, and worked in a variety of jobs before becoming a teacher at Portland Primary  School on Laird street, Birkenhead.

While working as a teacher, he wrote songs and continued to perform on a semi-professional basis, with limited success.  However, in 1994 his song "What Colour is the Wind", which tells the story of a young blind child's attempts to envision the world, began to be played in Ireland after a TV appearance on RTÉ's Kenny Live show. The song was used as the title track of one of Landsborough's albums.

Following the album's success in Ireland, Landsborough appeared on several TV shows in the UK. Since then, he has released ten additional albums, including originals, greatest hits and double CDs of previous releases. Overall, sales of his albums have exceeded 700,000 units. He also has had two number ones singles in the Irish pop chart, and several of his albums have topped the British country charts. In 1996, he converted to Catholicism.

One of his most successful releases, Still Can't Say Goodbye was recorded in Nashville in 1999 and resulted in Landsborough winning the BMCA Best Male Vocalist (2000) for the third year in succession, and the Southern Country Award for best album. He has performed at most major concert halls and theatres in the UK, including the London Palladium. He also toured Australia and New Zealand in 2001.

His songs have been recorded by Foster and Allen ("I Will Love You All My Life"), Roly Daniels ("Part of Me"), and George Hamilton IV ("Heaven Knows").

He believes that growing hair long or growing a Beard or Mustache is done to be better remembered.

Discography

Albums
Songs from the Heart (1992)
What Colour Is the Wind (1994)
With You in Mind (1996)
Further Down the Road (1997)
Still Can't Say Goodbye (1998)
Once in a While (2001)
Movin' On (2002)
Smile (2003)
Reflections
The Lighter Side (Comedy Album)
The Greatest Gift: An Album of Christmas Classics (2004)
My Heart Would Know (2005)
Heart and Soul (2006)
Under Blue Skies (2008) – No. 73 (UK)
Storyteller
Nothing Lasts Forever (September 2009)
Love, in a Song (2011)
Destination
Silhouette (2013)
Here, There and Everywhere

Compilations
The Very Best of Charlie Landsborough (1998)
The Collection (2000)
Classic Doubles (2002)
A Portrait of Charlie Landsborough: The Ultimate Collection (2005) (2 CDs)
The Very Best of Charlie Landsborough (2011) (2 CDs)
Ultimate Storyteller (2014) (Box Set)
Charlie Live: From Liverpool Philharmonic

Singles

DVDs
Charlie Landsborough – A Special Performance
An Evening with Charlie Landsborough / Shine Your Light – Double DVD Collection

Team
Jamie Landsborough - Tour Manager
Ken Davies - Manager
Tony Ariss - Keyboards, Vocals
Shane O'Borne Guitar, Vocals
Phil Mcdonough - Guitar, Vocals
Smithy - Merchandise

Awards

Professional comments

"The greatest response ever on the show".Pat Kenny - Kenny Live RTÉ TV
"The biggest reaction for any artist on our last series".BBC TV Pebble Mill
"If you like warmth, honesty and credibility in a performer you'll love Charlie Landsborough".Gerry Kelly - Kelly Ulster TV.
"Incredible talent and unique style, deserves to be a major success".Sean Murphy - London Weekend TV
"Charlie's like good wine, he matures quietly over a long period of time, when the cork was popped it was well worth the wait".Gerry Anderson - BBC TV
"A brand new album of brand new songs, all written and performed by a quiet, unassuming gentle man who could very well be Britain's next country-folk superstar, internationally!".George Hamilton IV

References

External links
Official website
Biography

Living people
1941 births
British folk guitarists
British male guitarists
British country singers
People from Birkenhead